Lus-la-Croix-Haute is a commune in the Drôme department in southeastern France.

Geography
It is situated in the Dauphiné Alps. It is the highest commune in the Drôme départment.

The community borders with the départements of Isère et the Hautes-Alpes (High-Alpes), between the massive mountains of Dévoluy in the east, the (valley) of Trièves in the north and the Diois in the west. Lus-la-Croix-Haute is centered between Clelles and Aspres-sur-Buëch. The community includes 24 areas, including La Caire, Les Corréardes, Le Trabuech, Mas Rebuffat, Mas Bourget, La Jarjatte, Les Morlières, Les Lussettes, Moulin de l'Ours, Les Fauries, and Les Miellons.

The community is known for the col de la Croix-Haute, at its northern limit, through which route national 75 joins Marseille to Grenoble, and which is a climate border between the Northern and Southern Alps. The community is also known as the source of the river Buëch, which flows in the valley of la Jarjatte through the magnificent cascades of Mougious, which is indeed the source of it in the valley of Buëch. 
The community has a railroad-station along the Lyon-Perrache to Marseille-Saint-Charles railroad line via Grenoble served by the TER of the connection Grenoble - Gap.

History

Around the first millennium, and during the 11th and 12th centuries, Lus-la-Croix Haute belonged to the lordship of Trièves, which was the property of the ancient counts of Die. The Bishops of Die played a considerable role in the region through the history. One of their principal vassals and feudal-lords was the family Odde de Bonniot, co-lords of Vercors, chivalrous family originating of the Lus-la-Croix-Haute and its surroundings, which was displaced to the region of Vivarais, to Orange, and to Velay and to the Netherlands (Holland) during the wars of religion in France.

Population

See also
Communes of the Drôme department
Parc naturel régional du Vercors

References
Chorier/ Histoire du Dauphiné

External links

 

Communes of Drôme